The Turkmenistan Cup is an annually held football tournament for Turkmen football clubs, known as one of the most important national tournaments.

The cup has been contested since 1993.

The competition's most successful performer is Köpetdag Aşgabat with 7 trophy.

The winner of the competition ordinarily got a spot in the AFC Cup group stage.

Competition system 
The competition is held under knockout format. Ýokary Liga teams enter the tournament at 1/4 final stage. Winners are determined by the results of two matches.

The final tie is played as a single match. Traditionally, it had been held in Ashgabat.

Winners 
Previous winners are:

Soviet time

1936    Lokomotiw Aşgabat
1937    Gyzyl Goşun Öýi Aşgabat
1938    Lokomotiw Aşgabat
1939    Dinamo Aşgabat
1940    Dinamo Aşgabat
1941-43   no tournament
1944    Lokomotiw Aşgabat
1945    Dinamo Aşgabat
1946    Dinamo Aşgabat
1947    Dinamo Aşgabat
1948      no tournament
1949    Spartak Aşgabat
1950      no tournament
1951    Lokomotiw Mary
1952    DOSA Aşgabat
1953    DOSA Aşgabat
1954    Hasyl Aşgabat
1955    Dinamo Aşgabat
1956    Spartak Aşgabat
1957    Gyzyl Metallist Aşgabat
1958    Gyzyl Metallist Aşgabat
1959    DOSA Aşgabat
1960    Gämigurluşyk Zawody Çärjew
1961    Serhetçi Aşgabat
1962    Ýyldyz Gyzylarbat
1963    Serhetçi Aşgabat
1964    Ýyldyz Gyzylarbat
1965    Serhetçi Aşgabat
1966    Serhetçi Aşgabat
1967    Serhetçi Aşgabat
1968    Serhetçi Aşgabat
1969    Serhetçi Aşgabat
1970    Sementçi Büzmeýin
1971    Sementçi Büzmeýin
1972    Energogurluşykçy Mary
1973    Lokomotiw Çärjew
1974    Nebitçi Krasnowodsk
1975    Nebitçi Krasnowodsk
1976    Nebitçi Krasnowodsk
1977    Şatlyk Mary
1978    Şatlyk Mary
1979    Şatlyk Mary
1980    Nebitçi Krasnowodsk
1981-86  no tournament
1987    Rotor Aşgabat
1988    Şapak Aşgabat
1989    Nebitçi Krasnowodsk
1990      no tournament
1991    Obahojalyktehnika Aşgabat
1992    Köpetdag Aşgabat

Since independence

Top-Performing Clubs

References

 
Cup
National association football cups
Recurring sporting events established in 1993
1993 establishments in Turkmenistan